Kasperi Liikonen (born 9 September 1994) is a Finnish professional footballer who plays for IF Gnistan, as a winger.

References

1994 births
Living people
Finnish footballers
Finland youth international footballers
FC Espoo players
FC Viikingit players
FC Viikkarit players
Kotkan Työväen Palloilijat players
FC Haka players
FC Honka players
IF Gnistan players
Kakkonen players
Ykkönen players
Veikkausliiga players
Association football wingers